Raghubir Singhji  (21 September 1869 – 26 July 1927) was the 26th ruler of the princely state of Bundi belonging to Hada Chauhan clan of Rajputs.

He was ruler of Bundi from 1889 till his death in 1927.

He was succeeded by Sir Ishwari Singhji. 
Government of India announced 'Padma Shri' will be awarded to Shri Maharao Raghuveer Singh on 26 January 2018.

References

1869 births
1927 deaths
Knights Grand Commander of the Order of the Star of India
Knights Grand Commander of the Order of the Indian Empire
Indian Knights Grand Cross of the Royal Victorian Order
Maharajas of Bundi
Rajput rulers
Hindu monarchs
Indian knights
Indian royalty